Abderrahmane Bechlaghem (born 6 July 1995) is an Algerian cyclist, who most recently rode for UCI Continental team . In 2019, Bechlagem was the winner of the Algerian National Road Race Championships.

Major results

2012
 African Junior Road Championships
1st  Road race
1st  Time trial
 Arab Junior Road Championships
1st  Road race
3rd  Time trial
2013
 Arab Junior Road Championships
1st  Time trial
2nd  Road race
 African Junior Road Championships
3rd  Time trial
3rd  Team time trial
9th Road race
2014
 8th Overall Tour d'Algérie
2015
 2nd  Team time trial, African Games
 2nd Overall Tour d'Annaba
1st Young rider classification
 3rd Circuit de Constantine
 6th Overall Tour de Blida
2016
 1st Young rider classification La Tropicale Amissa Bongo
 2nd Circuit d'Alger
 4th Grand Prix d'Oran
 8th Time trial, African Road Championships
 9th Overall Tour de Blida
2017
 3rd Time trial, National Under-23 Road Championships
 8th Time trial, African Road Championships
2019
 1st  Road race, National Road Championships

References

External links

1995 births
Living people
Algerian male cyclists
Place of birth missing (living people)
African Games silver medalists for Algeria
African Games medalists in cycling
Competitors at the 2015 African Games
21st-century Algerian people